The 2016–17 season was Associazione Calcio ChievoVerona's tenth consecutive season in Serie A. The club finished 14th in Serie A and advanced to the round of 16 in the Coppa Italia, where they were eliminated by Fiorentina.

Players

Squad information
In italics players who left the club during the season.

Out on loan

Transfers

In

Loans in

Out

Loans out

Pre-season and friendlies

Competitions

Serie A

League table

Results summary

Results by round

Matches

Coppa Italia

Statistics

Appearances and goals

|-
! colspan="10" style="background:#FFFF00; color:blue; border:2px solid blue; text-align:center"| Goalkeepers

|-
! colspan="10" style="background:#FFFF00; color:blue; border:2px solid blue; text-align:center"| Defenders

|-
! colspan="10" style="background:#FFFF00; color:blue; border:2px solid blue; text-align:center"| Midfielders

|-
! colspan="10" style="background:#FFFF00; color:blue; border:2px solid blue; text-align:center"| Forwards

|-
! colspan="10" style="background:#FFFF00; color:blue; border:2px solid blue; text-align:center"| Players transferred out during the season

Goalscorers

Last updated: 27 May 2017

Clean sheets

Last updated: 27 May 2017

Disciplinary record
Last updated: 27 May 2017

References

A.C. ChievoVerona seasons
Chievo